Karsznice may refer to the following places:
Karsznice, Łęczyca County in Łódź Voivodeship (central Poland)
Karsznice, Zduńska Wola County in Łódź Voivodeship (central Poland)
Karsznice, Świętokrzyskie Voivodeship (south-central Poland)